The flag of Kurdistan is the flag of Kurds and created by the Society for the Rise of Kurdistan in 1920. It would later, in different variants, be adopted as the national flag of different Kurdish states including Republic of Ararat, Republic of Mahabad and most recently by Kurdistan Region in 1992. Moreover, the Kingdom of Kurdistan used the crescent flag (shown below) which was also considered a Kurdish flag.

History

Origins (1920s) 

The flag was created in 1920 by the Society for the Rise of Kurdistan (CTK). Shortly after, it was used by the nationalist party Xoybûn who hoisted the flag over the city of Ağrı during the Ararat rebellion. In his memoir Doza Kurdistan, Kurdish politician Kadri Cemilpaşa of the CTK declared that this flag was the national Kurdish flag whose colors and shape had now been defined. In 1925, during the trial of CTK politicians in Turkey, they stated that the Ottoman flag was dead and that the Kurdish flag would shine like a sun. 

During the same period, the crescent flag was hoisted in Sulaymaniyah by Mahmud Barzanji of the Kingdom of Kurdistan. According to historian Rafiq Hilmi, the Kingdom of Kurdistan considered the crescent flag as the national flag of Kurds. He wrote: "A big meeting was held at the house of Şêx Qadir, the Speaker of the National Assembly, and with official permission, the official Kurdish flag was raised. On the day of the meeting, about 10,000 people gathered in front of the Grand Mosque."

Republic of Mahabad (1940s) 
Prior to the declaration of the Republic of Mahabad from Iran in 1946, Kurdish leaders in Iran from Democratic Party of Iranian Kurdistan (KDPI) with support from Kurds in Iraq, had prepared the flag to be used as the national flag of the Mahabad Republic. The prepared flag was altered and approved by the KDPI who went on to hoist it in the official office of the Iranian government in Mahabad on 17 December 1945. When the republic was declared on 22 January 1946, the flag was hoisted at the main square while Ey Reqîb was being sung. In his speech, President Qazi Muhammad declared the flag as "flag of Kurdistan" and it was hoisted in all towns which was under his control. Days before the collapse of the republic, President Muhammad handed over the flag on his desk to Mustafa Barzani, leader of Kurdistan Democratic Party, who had fled to Mahabad after the 1943 Barzani revolt.

Symbolism
The Kurdish flag is the most important symbol of cohesive Kurdish identity. Since it was first hoisted in 1946 to represent the concept of an independent Kurdistan (called the Republic of Mahabad and founded in Iranian territory) it has become a symbol of the national identity of Kurds.

The main characteristic of the flag is the blazing golden sun emblem (Roj in Kurdish) at its center. The emblem's sun disk has 21 rays, equal in size and shape, with the single odd ray at top and the two even rays on the bottom.

The symbolism of the colours is:

In the fall of 2006, the Iraqi Kurdish leadership gave orders for Kurdish officials to stop flying the Iraqi flag under decree number 60 "to hoist the flag of Iraqi Kurdistan". Masoud Barzani issued orders that the Ba'athist flag should be lowered and all regions in Iraqi Kurdistan should "hoist only the Kurdistan flag" because the symbols of Ba'athism were associated with the Anfal genocide where 180,000 people lost their lives. When the Ba'athist symbols were removed from the Iraqi flag in 2008, the KRG hoisted the Iraqi flag to fly alongside the Kurdish flag, reported to still be the practice as of March 2013. Flying the Iraqi flag side by side with the Kurdish flag is symbolic of their acceptance of Iraqi federalism.

Modern adaptation to international flag standards
The flag appeared in Kurdish media throughout the 1990s with MED TV, Kurdsat, Kurdistan TV and their affiliates broadcasting with the flag appearing frequently in their programming allowing it to become a symbol of Kurdish statehood.

Other flags used by Kurds

Similar flags
Due to Iranian roots of the Kurds, the colours used in flags used by Kurds are the same that are used in other Iranian-origin areas like Iran and Tajikistan.

Kurdistan Region's flag day 

Since 1993, the Kurdish Flag Day is celebrated on December 17.

References

External links
 

Kurds
History of the Kurdish people
Politics of Kurdistan
Politics of Kurdistan Region (Iraq)
Kurdish nationalist symbols
Kurd